Invisible Girl is the original name of Invisible Woman, a fictional character that appears in comic books published by Marvel Comics.

Invisible Girl or The Invisible Girls or variant, may refer to:

 Invisible person, a science fiction concept
 Invisible Girl (album), the 2009 album by The King Khan & BBQ Show, or the title song
"The Invisible Girl" (story), a short story by Mary Shelley published in The Keepsake for 1830
The Invisible Girl (film), a 2022 thriller drama film 
 "Invisible Girl", a song on the 2010 Gabriella Cilmi album Ten
The Invisible Girls, a British rock band
 An alternate title for ""Out of Mind, Out of Sight" (Buffy the Vampire Slayer)", an episode of the television series Buffy the Vampire Slayer
 Toru Hagakure or Invisible Girl, a fictional character in the manga My Hero Academia

See also

Invisible Woman (disambiguation)
Invisible Boy (disambiguation)